Nuévalos is a municipality located in the province of Zaragoza, Aragon, Spain.

According to the 2004 census (INE), the municipality has a population of 384 inhabitants. This small town is located in the Sierra de Solorio area, 2 km down the Piedra River from the Monasterio de Piedra.

References

Municipalities in the Province of Zaragoza